The tögrög or tugrik (Mongolian Cyrillic: , Mongolian script: ,; sign: ₮; code: MNT) is the official currency of Mongolia. It was historically subdivided into 100  ( / ). Currently, the lowest denomination in regular use is the 10-tögrög note and the highest is the 20,000-tögrög note.

In 2010, the tögrög rose 15% against the US dollar, due to the growth of the mining industry in Mongolia. However, its exchange rate eroded by 24% from early 2013 to June 2014 due to falling foreign investment and mining revenue.

Etymology
The word tögrög (төгрөг) refers to "circle", or a "circular object" (i.e. a coin). Today, it is rarely used outside of referring to the currency, with the exception of the phrase tögrög sar (төгрөг сар), meaning "full moon".

History

It replaced the Mongolian dollar and other currencies and became the sole legal currency on April 1, 1928.

Möngö coins are no longer in circulation as currency, owing to their negligible value. Today, they are sold online and to tourists as collectibles.

Coins
During socialism, the tögrög coin denominations were 1, 2, 5, 10, 15, 20, 50 möngö, and 1 tögrög. After the Mongolian People's Republic came to an end in 1992 and inflation surged, möngö coins were abandoned and larger tögrög values introduced.

Banknotes 
Like coins, the tögrög banknotes were very similar to the Soviet ruble during the Mongolian People's Republic era. The similarities included color theme, overall design, and the lineup of the denominations, which were 1, 3, 5, 10, 25, 50, 100 tögrög unless stated otherwise. The color for each value is
 1 tögrög: brown
 3 tögrög: green
 5 tögrög: blue
 10 tögrög: green
 20 tögrög: red
 25 tögrög: lilac
 50 tögrög: green
 100 tögrög: brown
Formerly, all banknotes were printed in the Soviet Union. Modern tögrög banknotes are generally printed in the United Kingdom.

Remarks
Images shown are the earliest variations of each value
Issued dates are listed for up to 2003. It is known that there is a 2005 edition of 10 tögrög, but it is yet unclear whether or not it was the only value for the 2005 edition.
Lower value notes (10 ~ 500 tögrög) issued in 2000 and after have line-patterned color underprint on the entire note, where the previous edition had near-white solid color. But one exception to the rule is the 2000 edition of 500 tögrög.
High value notes (500 ~ 10,000 tögrög) issued in 2002 and after have a patch on the lower right hand side of obverse as an improved anti-counterfeit device, which used to be printed only on the two highest values. The new patch is also more sophisticated than the ones in the 1990s. The Soyombo symbol was upgraded to a hologram on the two highest values. On series 2018 5000 tögrög, the hologram was changed to an OVMI ink.

See also
Economy of Mongolia

References

External links
Banknotes of Mongolia, Bank of Mongolia
Website at the Bank of Mongolia with history of Mongolian currency and pictures of tögrög

Togrog
Currency symbols
Circulating currencies
Currencies introduced in 1925